Robert Alan Mintzer (born January 27, 1953) is an American jazz saxophonist, composer, arranger, and big band leader.

Early life
Mintzer was born and raised in a Jewish family in New Rochelle, New York, on January 27, 1953. He attended the Interlochen Arts Academy, Michigan from 1969 to 1970, then was at the Hartt School of Music, Hartford, Connecticut for two years, before attending the Manhattan School of Music from 1972 to 1974.

Later life and career
Early in his career, Mintzer played in various big bands, including those led by Buddy Rich (1975–77), Thad Jones and Mel Lewis (1977–79), and Sam Jones (1978–80). While with Rich, he began writing big band music, and has since composed and arranged hundreds of pieces. In 2008, Mintzer and his family moved to Los Angeles, where he joined the faculty of the University of Southern California.

He is a member of the Grammy award-winning Yellowjackets and holds the Buzz McCoy endowed chair of jazz studies at the University of Southern California.

In 2014, he agreed, with some persuasion, to become Chief Conductor of the WDR Big Band in Cologne, Germany, sharing the job 50:50 with Vince Mendoza.

Discography

As leader 
 Source (Agharta, 1982)
 Horn Man (Agharta, 1982)
 Papa Lips (Eastworld , 1983)
 Incredible Journey (DMP, 1985)
 Camouflage (DMP, 1986)
 Spectrum (DMP, 1988)
 Urban Contours (DMP, 1989)
 Hymn (Owl, 1991) – rec. 1990
 Art of the Big Band (DMP, 1991)
 I Remember Jaco (Novus, 1992)
 One Music (DMP, 1991)
 Departure (DMP, 1993)
 Only in New York (DMP, 1994)
 Twin Tenors (Novus, 1994)
 The First Decade (DMP, 1995)
 Big Band Trane (DMP, 1996)
 Live at the Berlin Jazz Festival (Basic, 1996) – rec. 1987
 Latin from Manhattan, (DMP, 1998)
 Quality Time (TVT, 1998)
 Homage to Count Basie (DMP, 2000)
 Bop Boy (Explore, 2002)
 Gently (DMP, 2002)
 Live at MCG with Special Guest Kurt Elling, (MCG Jazz, 2004)
 Hymn (Mesa, Blue Moon, Owl, Universal, 1992, 2006)
 Old School: New Lessons featuring Kurt Elling, (Telarc/MCG Jazz, 2006)
 Longing (EmArcy, Owl, Universal, Sunnyside, 2003, 2006, 2007)
 In the Moment (Art of Life, 2007)
 Universal Syncopations, Vol. 2 (ECM, 2007)
 Swing Out, (Telarc/MCG Jazz, 2008)
 La Vita e Bella (Abeat, 2009)
 Canyon Cove, (2010)
 The Hudson Project (Concord Midline/Stretch/Universal, 2011)
 For the Moment, (MCG Jazz, 2012)
 Get Up (MCG Jazz, 2015)
 All L.A. Band (Fuzzy, 2016)
 Meeting of Minds with New York Voices (MCG Jazz, 2018)

As co-leader 
With Peter Erskine, Darek Oleszkiewicz, Alan Pasqua
 Standards 2: Movie Music (Fuzzy Music, 2010)

As a member 
Yellowjackets
 Greenhouse (MCA, 1991)
 Live Wires (GRP, 1992) – live
 Like a River (GRP, 1993)
 Runferyerlife (GRP, 1994)
 Collection (1995)
 Dreamland (Warner Bros., 1995)
 Blue Hats (Warner Bros., 1997)
 Club Nocturne (Warner Bros., 1998)
 Priceless Jazz Collection (1998)
 The Best of Yellowjackets (1999)
 Mint Jam (2002)
 Time Squared (2003)
 Peace Round (2003)
 Altered State (2005)
 Twenty Five (2006)
 Lifecyle featuring Mike Stern (2008)
 Timeline (2011)
 A Rise in the Road (2013)
 Cohearance (2016)
 Raising Our Voice featuring Luciana Souza (2018)

The GRP All-Star Big Band
 GRP All Star Big Band: GRP All-Star Big Band (GRP, 1992)
 GRP All-Star Big Band: Dave Grusin Presents GRP All-Star Big Band Live!, (GRP, 1993)
 GRP All-Star Big Band: All Blues, (GRP, 1995)

As sideman 
 Buddy Rich, Buddy Rich (PolJazz, 1977) – live
 Sam Jones, Something New (Interplay, 1979)
 Jaco Pastorius, Invitation (Warner Bros., 1983) – live rec. 1982
 Bobby McFerrin, Bang!Zoom (Blue Note, 1995)
 Nova Bossa Nova, Jazz Influence (Arkadia Jazz, 1997)
 Toninho Horta, From Ton to Tom (Video Arts Music, 1998)
 Miroslav Vitouš, Universal Syncopations II (ECM, 2007) – rec. 2004–05
 New York Voices, A Day Like This (MCG Jazz, 2007)
 The Sean J. Kennedy Quartet, Queen Anne's Revenge (Lost World, 2007)
 Tohpati, Save the Planet (Ethnomission, 2010)
 Kurt Elling, The Gate (Concord, 2011) – rec. 2010
 Kait Dunton, Mountain Suite (Real & Imagined, 2012)
 Dewa Budjana, Joged Kahyangan (Moonjune, 2013)
 Roberto Tola, Bein' Green (RT Music, 2017)
 Denis Krupin,  Path To Light (2021)

References

External links 

American jazz tenor saxophonists
American male saxophonists
American jazz bass clarinetists
American jazz bandleaders
American jazz composers
American male jazz composers
Bass clarinetists
Big band bandleaders
Grammy Award winners
Jazz arrangers
Living people
Go-go musicians
Musicians from New Rochelle, New York
1953 births
Jazz musicians from New York (state)
21st-century American saxophonists
21st-century clarinetists
21st-century American male musicians
GRP All-Star Big Band members
Yellowjackets members
Nova Bossa Nova members